Thomas Langdon may refer to:

Thomas Langdon (MP) (died 1433), English politician
Thomas Langdon (cricketer) (1879–1944), English cricketer
Thomas Langdon (Australian politician) (1832–1914), English-born Australian politician